Tyler Jolly (born 29 July 1999) is a Scottish boxer. He participated at the 2022 Commonwealth Games in the boxing competition, being awarded the bronze medal in the men's welterweight event. He previously participated at the 2021 AIBA World Boxing Championships in the welterweight event, winning no medal.

References 

1999 births
Living people
Place of birth missing (living people)
Scottish male boxers
Welterweight boxers
Boxers at the 2022 Commonwealth Games
Commonwealth Games bronze medallists for Scotland
Commonwealth Games medallists in boxing
Medallists at the 2022 Commonwealth Games